Gold Striker is a wooden roller coaster located at California's Great America amusement park. Built by Great Coasters International and designed by Jeff Pike, Gold Striker was the park's eighth roller coaster which opened to the public on May 31, 2013. Its  tunnel is the longest in the world to be featured on the first drop, and it was marketed as the "tallest and fastest wooden coaster in Northern California". The roller coaster takes on the theme of the Old West and references the California Gold Rush of the 19th century.

History
California's Great America originally planned to build a new roller coaster for the 2009 season, but issues led to the project's cancellation. Plans were revived in 2012 when a permit was requested and approved to construct the new coaster in the northern half of the park. Construction began in May 2012, and the first pieces of lumber were delivered the following month in early June. On July 25, 2012, Cedar Fair Entertainment Company filed a trademark for the name Gold Striker. Vertical construction began in early August 2012. Gold Striker was officially announced on August 29, 2012. Representatives of the San Francisco 49ers were on hand at the ceremony, as the ride shares the same Gold Rush theme as the football team.

On January 30, 2013, Gold Striker reached its first milestone as the ride's lift hill was completed. On February 20, 2013, California's Great America announced that the first drop would be fully enclosed, setting a world record for the longest drop tunnel on a wooden coaster. The park auctioned seats on the first six trains for Gold Striker. Members of the general public were invited to participate in an early riding session on April 30, 2013, during the park's promotional shoot. Gold Striker opened on May 31, 2013 and had an official opening ceremony the following day.

On July 1, 2013, Gold Striker was temporarily closed due to noise complaints. According to park management, the high thrill of the ride caused screaming passengers to slightly exceed city standards. The attraction reopened on July 4, 2013 after a  tunnel was added.

Ride experience

Layout
After departing the station, the train makes a slight turn to the right followed by another turn to the right, then the train turns left onto the  lift hill. The coaster's first drop wraps around the park's signature Star Tower attraction. The train then turns to the left into a bunny hop, passing by the station and lift hill. It then makes a turn-around to the right followed by an 80 degree banked turn. After the turn, the train passes back under the track into a "Midway turn" which, being another 80-degree turn, faces the train towards the park's Celebration Plaza. Passing again back under the track, the coaster goes through the final flat turnaround before making its way to the brake run.

Track

Awards

Gallery

See also
 2013 in amusement parks

References

External links

California's Great America
Roller coasters introduced in 2013
Roller coasters in California
Roller coasters operated by Cedar Fair
2013 establishments in California